John Daniel "Danny" Olivas (born May 25, 1966 in North Hollywood, California) is an American engineer and a former NASA astronaut. Olivas has flown on two space shuttle missions, STS-117 and STS-128. He performed EVAs on both missions, totaling 34hrs 28min.

In 2013,Mr. Olivas joined the University of Texas at El Paso as Director of the Center for the Advancement of Space Safety and Mission Assurance Research (CASSMAR) and will oversee space initiatives on campus.

Personal life
Born in North Hollywood, California, raised in El Paso, Texas, received a Bachelor of Science degree in mechanical engineering from the University of Texas at El Paso in 1989, a Master of Science  degree in mechanical engineering from the University of Houston in 1993 and a doctorate in mechanical engineering and materials science from Rice University in 1996. In 2013 Mr. Olivas joined the University of Texas at El Paso as Director of the Center for the Advancement of Space Safety and Mission Assurance Research (CASSMAR) and will oversee space initiatives on campus. In 2019, he appeared as a contestant on Nickelodeon's revival of Are You Smarter than a 5th Grader?.

NASA career
NASA selected Olivas as an astronaut candidate in 1998.  His astronaut training included orientation briefings and tours, numerous scientific and technical briefings, intensive instruction in Shuttle and International Space Station systems, physiological training and ground school to prepare for T-38 flight training, as well as learning water and wilderness survival techniques.  From 1999 to 2002, he was assigned technical responsibilities within the Robotics Branch as lead for the Special Purpose Dexterous Manipulator Robot and the Mobile Transporter.  From 2002 to 2005 he was assigned to the EVA Branch and supported the research effort focused on developing materials, tools and techniques to perform on-orbit shuttle repair.  In July 2002, Olivas served as an aquanaut during the NEEMO 3 mission aboard the Aquarius underwater laboratory.  In April 2005, he was a crew member on the NEEMO 8 mission.  In 2006, Olivas served as lead of the Hardware Integration Section of the Space Station Branch, responsible for ensuring proper configuration and integration of future station modules and visiting vehicles.

Spaceflight experience

STS-117
STS-117 Atlantis (June 8–22, 2007) was the 118th Shuttle mission and the 21st mission to visit the International Space Station, delivering the second starboard truss segment, the third set of U.S. solar arrays, batteries and associated equipment.  The mission also entailed the first ever on-orbit EVA repair to the Space Shuttle, Atlantis.  During two spacewalks, Olivas accumulated 14 hours and 13 mins of EVA experience.  The mission also delivered and returned with an ISS expedition crew member.  STS-117 returned to land at Edwards Air Force Base, California, having traveled more than 5.8 million miles in 13 days, 20 hours and 20 minutes.

STS-128
Olivas served as a mission specialist on space shuttle Discovery on the STS-128 mission, which launched on August 28, 2009.  Discovery carried the Multi-Purpose Logistics Module filled with science and storage racks to the ISS. The mission included three spacewalks to remove and replace a materials processing experiment outside ESA's Columbus module and return an empty ammonia tank assembly.

See also

References

External links
 NASA biography
 Spacefacts biography of John Olivas
 Website special section on Olivas with stories, videos, slideshows and more on kfoxtv.com

1965 births
Living people
American astronauts
American people of Mexican descent
Aquanauts
People from El Paso, Texas
Rice University alumni
University of Houston alumni
University of Texas at El Paso alumni
Space Shuttle program astronauts
Hispanic and Latino American scientists
Spacewalkers
Hispanic and Latino American aviators